Svet kompjutera (World of Computers) (Started October 1984) is a computer magazine published in Serbia. It has the highest circulation in the country (e.g. in period from January till February 2002 circulation was 43,000 copies). Svet kompjutera deals with subjects on home, PC computers, tablet computers, smartphones (mobile phones), and video game consoles as well as their use for work and entertainment. Its aim is to inform the readers about the latest events in Serbian and world computer scene and to present products that are interesting for its readers. Its editorial staff sees this as their main task to advise computer users on how to use their hardware and software in the best way.

It is one of the editions of Politika AD, one of the biggest media companies in the Balkans. It is published monthly and can be purchased in all newsstands in Serbia. It can be also found in North Macedonia, Slovenia, Bosnia and Herzegovina, Croatia, Montenegro and many other European countries with a possibility to subscribe to it from anywhere in the world.

The magazine consists of 132 pages, commercial advertisements forming 35% to 40% of the magazine. It is printed in quality full colour offset technology.

Four issues of this magazine were printed with different covers. The October issue of 2004 was printed with three different covers, the October issue of 2006 was printed with two different covers, and the December issue of 2011 and the October issue of 2014 were printed with four different covers.

The editorial staff had been always consisting of young people - the average age being 26 years, while the average age of contributors is 20 years. Its readers are mainly young and middle-aged people, mostly from Serbia and some from ex-Yugoslav countries.

Current (October 2011) Editor-In-Chief of Svet kompjutera is Nenad Vasovic. Current executive editors are Miodrag Kuzmanovic and Tihomir Stancevic.

History
The first issue of the Svet kompjutera was printed in October 1984. Ever since, the magazine has been dealing with small computers, from ZX Spectrum and Commodore 64, via Amiga to today's PCs.

Most people famous in the Serbian (ex Yugoslav), Serbian and Belgrade computer scene have been working for the Svet kompjutera. The first editor-in-chief was Milan Misic, later Politika'''s correspondent from India and Japan, then foreign policy column editor, and former editor-in-chief in the same newspaper. Before settling in another businesses, contributors to the development of the Svet kompjutera were the following individuals: Stanko Popović (working independently in computer business), Stanko Stojiljković (editor in Ekspres daily newspaper), Sergej Marcenko (marketing editor in political weekly magazine NIN), Andrija Kolundžić (working independently in computer business in Tokyo, Japan), Aleksandar Radovanovic (now working at various universities around the world), Voja Antonić, Dragoslav Jovanović (working at the Belgrade University), Jovan Puzovic (working at the Belgrade University), Nenad Balint (working in IT company in United Kingdom), Aleksandar Petrović (manager of a software company in Canada), Dalibor Lanik (working as a programmer in Czech Republic) and many others.

During 1986, when the home computers made the biggest boom, a games subsection of the Svet kompjutera started to evolve into a special issue Svet igara (Games World). This issue was published from time to time as a supplement to the games column in the magazine. Up until now, 14 issues have been published.

The same year, Svet kompjutera had a special edition in Russian that was distributed to the former Soviet Union.

"Computer Grand Prix", organized by the "ComputerWorld", is a contest for the best hardware and software products on domestic market. Unfortunately, during UN sanctions, organized import of such products was not allowed, so it was not possible to organize this contest.

Also, in 1988 the Svet kompjutera organized "Computer '88", a small computer fair in downtown Belgrade. It consisted of the exhibition and presentations, lectures and special broadcasts in Belgrade media.

In August 2005 Svet kompjutera'' formed its official Web forum named "Forum Sveta kompjutera".
As of February 2011 it has over 26,000 users and over 1,200,000 posts in over 56,000 topics.

Logos

From October 1984, for this magazine, there are two different logos. The first logo of magazine is used from October 1984 to October 1991, and the second and current logo is in use from October 1991.

External links
 Official site (in Serbian)
 SK forums (in Serbian)
 English section of the site
 "Svet kompjutera" slavi 20. godišnjicu (in Serbian)

Magazines established in 1984
Mass media in Belgrade
Monthly magazines
Svet kompjutera
1984 establishments in Yugoslavia
Magazines published in Yugoslavia